History 101 is a documentary streaming television series that premiered on Netflix on May 22, 2020. The premise revolves around history mini-lessons consisting of archive footage, facts and graphs about various topics. Netflix released a second season of the series on August 25, 2022.

Episodes

Season 1 (2020)

Season 2 (2022)

Release 
History 101 was released on May 22, 2020, on Netflix.

In June 2020, Netflix removed the ninth episode, which covered the HIV and AIDS epidemic, after outrage from members of the Haitian-American community. In August 2020 the episode was restored.

References

External links
 
 

2020 British television series debuts
2020 British television series endings
2020s British documentary television series
English-language Netflix original programming
Netflix original documentary television series
Cultural depictions of Indira Gandhi
ITN